Elmer J. Burr (May 11, 1908 – December 25, 1942) was a United States Army soldier and a recipient of the United States military's highest decoration—the Medal of Honor—for his actions in World War II.

Biography
Burr was born on May 11, 1908, in Neenah, Wisconsin. He joined the Wisconsin Army National Guard in about 1928 and served with the 32nd Infantry Division. After the 32nd Division was federalized in 1940, he participated in training exercises with his unit until late 1941, when he was discharged for being over the 28-year age limit. However, the attack on Pearl Harbor on December 7, 1941, led to Burr re-enlisting from Menasha, Wisconsin, and rejoining the 32nd Division.

After a few months of training in Australia, he was sent to New Guinea. By December 24, 1942, he was serving as a first sergeant in Company I of the 127th Infantry Regiment at the village of Buna. On that day, he smothered the blast of an enemy-thrown hand grenade with his body, sacrificing himself to protect those around him. He suffered severe wounds to his abdomen and died in a field hospital the next day. For this action, he was posthumously awarded the Medal of Honor ten months later, on October 11, 1943.

Burr, aged 34 at his death, was buried at Oak Hill Cemetery in his hometown of Neenah.

Medal of Honor citation
First Sergeant Burr's official Medal of Honor citation reads:

See also

List of Medal of Honor recipients for World War II

References

1908 births
1942 deaths
United States Army personnel killed in World War II
United States Army Medal of Honor recipients
United States Army soldiers
People from Neenah, Wisconsin
Military personnel from Wisconsin
World War II recipients of the Medal of Honor
Deaths by hand grenade
Wisconsin National Guard personnel